TRNA-dihydrouridine47 synthase (NAD(P)+) (Dus3p, tRNA-dihydrouridine synthase 3) is an enzyme with systematic name tRNA-5,6-dihydrouracil47:NAD(P)+ oxidoreductase. This enzyme catalyses the following chemical reaction

 5,6-dihydrouracil47 in tRNA + NAD(P)+  uracil47 in tRNA + NAD(P)H + H+

This enzyme specifically modifies uracil47 in tRNA.

References

External links 
 

EC 1.3.1